Par Surakh may refer to:
 Par Surakh, Bagh-e Malek
 Par Surakh, Izeh